The 2018–19 Liberty Flames men's basketball team represented Liberty University in the 2018–19 NCAA Division I men's basketball season. The team played its home games in Lynchburg, Virginia for the 29th consecutive season at Vines Center, with a capacity of 8,085. The team was led by Ritchie McKay, in his sixth season, but fourth season since his return to the program. They were first-year members of the ASUN Conference. They finished the season 29–7, 14–2 in ASUN play to share the regular season championship with Lipscomb. They defeated Jacksonville, North Florida and Lipscomb to be champions of the ASUN tournament. They received the ASUN's automatic-bid to the NCAA tournament where they defeated Mississippi State in the first round before losing in the second round to Virginia Tech.

Previous season
They were members of the Big South Conference. They finished the season 22–14, 9–9 in Big South play to finish in a four-way tie for fifth place. They defeated Campbell and UNC Asheville to advance to the championship game of the Big South tournament where they lost to Radford. They were invited to the CollegeInsider.com Tournament where they defeated North Carolina A&T in the first round in a game referred to as the Jim Phelan Classic. They received a second round bye and defeated Central Michigan in the quarterfinals before losing in the semifinals to UIC.

Departures

2018-19 Newcomers

Roster

Roster is subject to change as/if players transfer or leave the program for other reasons.

Schedule and results

|-
!colspan=12 style=|Exhibition

|-
!colspan=12 style=|Non-conference regular season

|-
!colspan=9 style=| Atlantic Sun Conference regular season

|-
!colspan=12 style=|Atlantic Sun Conference tournament
|-

|-
!colspan=9 style=| NCAA tournament

References

Liberty Flames basketball seasons
Liberty
Liberty Fl
Liberty Fl
Liberty